2K18 may refer to:

 the year 2018
 NBA 2K18, video game
 WWE 2K18, video game